1274 Delportia, provisional designation , is a stony Florian asteroid from the inner regions of the asteroid belt, approximately 10 kilometers in diameter. It was discovered on 28 November 1932, by Belgian astronomer Eugène Delporte at Uccle Observatory in Belgium. It was named after the discoverer himself.

Orbit and classification 

Delportia is a stony S-type asteroid on the Tholen taxonomic scheme. As a member of the Flora family, one of the largest families of the main belt, it orbits the Sun in the inner main-belt at a distance of 2.0–2.5 AU once every 3 years and 4 months (1,216 days). Its orbit has an eccentricity of 0.11 and an inclination of 4° with respect to the ecliptic.

Physical characteristics

Rotation period 

A rotational light curve of Delportia was obtained by American astronomer Edwin E. Sheridan in March 2007. Light curve analysis gave a well-defined rotation period of 5.615 hours with a brightness variation of 0.05 magnitude, superseding a period of 5.5 hours with an amplitude of 0.09 magnitude obtained by French amateur astronomer René Roy in December 2005. In February 2010, photometric observations at the Palomar Transient Factory gave a period of 5.6204 hours and an amplitude of 0.26 magnitude.

Diameter and albedo 

According to the surveys carried out by NASA's Wide-field Infrared Survey Explorer with its subsequent NEOWISE mission, and the Japanese Akari satellite, Delportia measures 9.61 and 12.95 kilometers in diameter, and its surface has an albedo of 0.46 and 0.20, respectively. The Collaborative Asteroid Lightcurve Link assumes a standard albedo for stony asteroids of 0.20 and calculates a diameter of 12.85 kilometers using an absolute magnitude of 11.82.

Naming 

Based on a suggestion by Gustav Stracke, this minor planet was named for its discoverer, Eugène Delporte (1882–1955), prolific discoverer of minor planets, astronomer and director at the discovering Uccle Observatory during 1936–1947. The lunar crater Delporte is also named in his honor. The official naming citation was first mentioned in The Names of the Minor Planets by Paul Herget in 1955.

Notes

References

External links 
 Asteroid Lightcurve Database (LCDB), query form (info )
 Dictionary of Minor Planet Names, Google books
 Asteroids and comets rotation curves, CdR – Observatoire de Genève, Raoul Behrend
 Discovery Circumstances: Numbered Minor Planets (1)-(5000) – Minor Planet Center
 
 

001274
Discoveries by Eugène Joseph Delporte
Named minor planets
001274
19321128